Gowienica is a river of Poland, a right tributary of the Oder near Stepnica.

Rivers of Poland
Rivers of West Pomeranian Voivodeship